Pronotogrammus is a genus of colourful marine ray-finned fishes in the subfamily Anthiinae, which is part of the family Serranidae, the groupers and sea basses.

They are red, pink, and yellow, and reach  in length depending on the species involved.

Species
Based on FishBase, the following species are included in Pronotogrammus:

 Pronotogrammus eos Gilbert, 1890 (Bigeye bass)– East Pacific
 Pronotogrammus martinicensis ((Guichenot, 1868) (Roughtongue bass) – West Atlantic
 Pronotogrammus multifasciatus Gill, 1863 (Threadfin bass) – East Pacific

Fishbase notes that P. eos is classified in the genus Baldwinella by some authorities.

References

Anthiinae